DXLL is a call sign assigned to two radio stations and one television station in the Philippines:
 DXLL-AM, an AM radio station broadcasting in Zamboanga City with the brand Mango Radio
 DXLL-FM, an FM radio station broadcasting in Davao City with the brand 94.7 One Radio
 DXLL-TV, a TV station broadcasting in Zamboanga City with the brand ABS-CBN Zamboanga